Duncan Bailey McCormick (born November 1, 1995) is an American soccer player who last played for Arizona United SC in the USL.

Career

Professional
McCormick originally signed a letter of intent to play college soccer at Wake Forest University, however he decided to skip college and sign a professional contract with Seattle Sounders FC 2, a USL affiliate club of Seattle Sounders FC.  On March 21, 2015, McCormick made his professional debut for the club in a 4–2 victory over Sacramento Republic FC.

References

1995 births
Living people
American soccer players
Tacoma Defiance players
Phoenix Rising FC players
Association football midfielders
Soccer players from Washington (state)
USL Championship players